Sam Schröder and Niels Vink defeated the two-time defending champion Dylan Alcott and his partner Heath Davidson in the final, 6–3, 6–2 to win the quad doubles wheelchair tennis title at the 2021 US Open.

Alcott and Andy Lapthorne were the two-time defending champions, but did not compete together. Lapthorne partnered David Wagner, but was defeated in the semifinals by Schröder and Vink.

Seeds

Draw

Finals

References

External links 
 Draw

Wheelchair Quad Doubles
U.S. Open, 2021 Quad Doubles